Firuzeh is a city in Razavi Khorasan Province, Iran.

Firuzeh may refer to:
 Firuzeh, Kerman
 Firuzeh, Kermanshah
 Firuzeh, Zalu Ab, Kermanshah Province
 Firuzeh, North Khorasan
 Firuzeh, alternate name of Kalateh-ye Firuzeh, in North Khorasan Province, Iran
 Firuzeh, Dargaz, Razavi Khorasan Province
 Firuzeh County, an administrative subdivision of Razavi Khorasan Province, Iran
 Firuzeh Rural District, an administrative subdivision of Razavi Khorasan Province, Iran